Cao Yifei (born May 20, 1988 in Jiaozuo, Henan) is a male Chinese sports shooter, who competed for Team China at the 2008 Summer Olympics.

Major performances
 2005 National Games – 1st 50 m small-bore rifle prone;
 2006 World Championships Youth Group – 1st 50 m small-bore rifle 3x40;
 2007 National Intercity Games – 1st 50 m small-bore rifle prone/3x40

Records
 2005 National Games – 702.7, 50 m small-bore rifle prone (NR)

References
 http://2008teamchina.olympic.cn/index.php/personview/personsen/2815

External links
 

1988 births
Living people
Chinese male sport shooters
ISSF rifle shooters
Olympic shooters of China
People from Jiaozuo
Shooters at the 2008 Summer Olympics
Shooters at the 2016 Summer Olympics
Asian Games medalists in shooting
Sport shooters from Henan
Shooters at the 2010 Asian Games
Shooters at the 2014 Asian Games
Universiade medalists in shooting
Asian Games gold medalists for China
Asian Games silver medalists for China
Asian Games bronze medalists for China
Medalists at the 2010 Asian Games
Medalists at the 2014 Asian Games
Universiade silver medalists for China
Medalists at the 2011 Summer Universiade
Medalists at the 2013 Summer Universiade
21st-century Chinese people